HMS Bickerton was a  of the Royal Navy. She served during the World War II as a convoy escort and anti-submarine warfare vessel in the Battle of the Atlantic and was an effective U-boat killer, being credited with the destruction of two U-boats during a service career of just 10 months. Bickerton was lost in action on 22 August 1944.

Name
Originally this ship was provisionally given the name USS Eisele (this name was reassigned to ).

Construction
Bickerton was ordered on 10 January 1942, as DE-75, a long-hulled turbo-diesel (TE) type destroyer escort, one of more than 500 such vessels built for ASW to a collaborative British-American design.
She was laid down on 3 May 1943, by the Bethlehem Hingham Shipyard in Hingham, Massachusetts.
She was launched on 24 July and completed 17 October, in the remarkably (but not unusually) short build time of 5 months 14 days

Service career
On commissioning and working up Bickerton sailed for Britain, where she was modified to meet Royal Navy requirements. In March 1944 she was allocated to Western Approaches Command as senior ship of 5th Escort Group under her new captain, Cdr. D MacIntyre

In April 5EG joined ON 233 as support group, but was detached to hunt for a U-boat on weather-reporting duty. Of the crew of U-765, 37 died and 11 survived.
A further search for the U-boat sent as U-765'''s relief was unsuccessful.

In June Bickerton and 5EG were deployed in the English Channel as part of Operation Neptune, the naval component of the Normandy landings. Their task was to guard against interference by U-boats from the Biscay ports. 
On 15 June the group was in an unsuccessful action against a U-boat, during which the frigate Mourne was sunk. (The U-boat, U-767, was caught three days later and destroyed by 14 EG.)

Ten days later on 25 June, off Start Point, Bickerton and 5 EG found and sank  . Of the crew of U-269, 13 died and 39 survived.

Fate
in August 1944 Bickerton and 5EG were escorting the escort carriers ( and ) from the Home Fleet (under Admiral Moore), which covered the convoy JW 59 and launched further attacks (Operation Goodwood) on the German battleship  in Altenfjord. Before the group was able to launch an attack on Tirpitz,  encountered them on her search for the convoy northwest of the North Cape in the Barents Sea. At about 01:00 on 22 August, at position , U-354 badly damaged Nabob with a pattern-running FAT torpedo spread. The U-boat then tried to sink her at 01:22 with a GNAT homing torpedo, which struck Bickerton. Two days later U-354 was herself sunk attacking convoy JW 59.

Battle honoursBickerton earned the following battle honours for service:
 Atlantic 1944
 English Channel 1944
 Normandy 1944
Arctic 1944

Successes
During her service Bickerton was credited with the destruction of two U-boats. 

Notes

References

Bibliography
 Clay Blair : Hitler's U-Boat War Vol II: The Hunted 1942–1945 (1998) 

Peter Elliott : Allied Escort Ships of World War II (1977)  

Paul Kemp  : U-Boats Destroyed''  ( 1997) .

External links
HMS Bickerton at uboat.net
 HMS Bickerton at navalhistory.net
Uboat.net page for U-765
Uboat.net page for U-269
Uboat.net page for U-354
captainclassfrigates.co.uk

Buckley-class destroyer escorts
Captain-class frigates
Ships built in Hingham, Massachusetts
World War II shipwrecks in the Arctic Ocean
Shipwrecks in the Barents Sea
1943 ships
Maritime incidents in August 1944
Ships sunk by German submarines in World War II